USS Stewart may refer to the following ships of the United States Navy:

She served briefly in the Imperial Japanese Navy, after being sunk and abandoned.
Since 1974 she is a museum ship in Galveston, Texas.

United States Navy ship names

ja:スチュワート (駆逐艦)